Milorad Janković (10 August 1940 – 24 December 2020) was a Yugoslav footballer who played at both professional and international levels as a striker. He played club football for Radnički Niš between 1964 and 1974, and earned one cap for Yugoslavia in 1966.

He died on 24 December 2020, at the age of 80.

References

1940 births
2020 deaths
Serbian footballers
Yugoslav footballers
Yugoslavia international footballers
Yugoslav First League players
FK Radnički Niš players
Association football forwards